Boneh-ye Hajj Nemat (also Romanized as Boneh-ye Ḩājj Neʿmat) is a village in Shabankareh Rural District, Shabankareh District, Dashtestan County, Bushehr Province, Iran. At the 2011 census, its population was 32, in 7 families.

References 

Populated places in Dashtestan County